Singha is a 2019 Kannada-language action drama film directed by Vijay Kiran, starring Chiranjeevi Sarja and Aditi Prabhudeva and Tara and Aruna Balraj in supporting roles. The film is remake of 2013 Tamil film Kutti Puli.

Plot

Cast
 Chiranjeevi Sarja as Sinnga
 Aditi Prabhudeva as Geetha
 Ravi Shankar as Rudraswamy
 Tara as Janakamma

Soundtrack

The soundtrack is composed by Dharma Vish on lyrics of Chethan Kumar, Kaviraj and V. Nagendra Prasad.

Release
The film was theatrically released on 19 July 2019.

Reception

Critical response 
Vinay Lokesh of The Times of India gave the film two and half stars out of five, praising performance of Tara, he felt that Sinnga had all the elements of a pucca commercial film, but lacked the synchronisation in content and the narration. Concluding, he wrote, "Sinnga could be one-time watch for those who love mass films."
A Sharadhaa of Cinema Express gave the film a rating of 3/5 and wrote "So, Sinnga is not a smart action movie, but, just a routine commercial entertainer for the masses. Many may find it tiresome with an overdose of unrealistic stunts, inconsistent narration, and unrelated songs."Vijaya Karnataka gave the film a rating of 3/5 and wrote "This is a ready-made cinema. This story needs more scenes like this. So the mass audience can disappear. Maternal viewers can also offer support."

References

External links
 

Kannada remakes of Tamil films
2010s Kannada-language films
Indian action drama films
2019 films
2019 action drama films
2019 masala films